New York is a 1976 work of travel and observation by Anthony Burgess.

Background
It was written for Time–Life's The Great Cities series of books.

Burgess lived in the city for two years in the early 1970s, teaching literature and creative writing at City College and Columbia University.

1976 books
Books about New York City
Books by Anthony Burgess
British travel books
English non-fiction books

References